The Glen Afton Branch was a branch railway line of 7.9 km (originally 14.1 km) in the Waikato in New Zealand, built to serve coal mines in the Awaroa district west of Huntly at Rotowaro, Pukemiro and Glen Afton. Rotowaro is Māori for "coal lake".

When handed over from Public Works to NZR in 1915 it was called the Awaroa Branch, but was also known as the Glen Afton Branch to about 1974, then as the Rotowaro Branch to 3 November 1988, then as the Rotowaro Industrial Line. By 2014 it was again named the Rotowaro Branch.

History
The first 5 km was authorised in 1910 and required a road-rail bridge over the Waikato River, with an extension which carried the railway over the main highway. The bridge, constructed from 1911 to October 1914, had 10 spans of Australian hardwood (8 of 30.5m and 2 of 12.2m) on steel and reinforced concrete piers. The nearby Wilton Collieries Co complained that they too did not have public money put into building their line and river bridge. The first 5 km of track opened about 1911, and this is confirmed by a 1914 report saying the Huntly-Awaroa line is complete over the first  section, "well advanced" by co-operative labour over the next  and "fair progress" with 5 small contracts to a proposed station  from Huntly, "where coal from the Pukemiro collieries will be delivered for transport. An addition is being made to the combined bridge over the Waikato river to carry it over the Main South road. It is hoped by the end of the ensuing summer to have the rails laid to the junction with the Pukemiro collieries line. As the works now in hand draw to a close, it is proposed to continue operations on this line in the direction of the Burnt bridge. The expenditure upon the railway and bridge during last financial year amounted to £16,503, and for the current year a vote of £30,000 is proposed." In 2015 prices £46,503 would be equivalent to $6.8m.

New Zealand Co-operative Dairy Company started mining at Glen Afton in 1921. The 2.5 km extension from Rotowaro to Pukemiro and Glen Afton was built between 1921 and 1924, although a further proposed extension beyond Glen Afton did not proceed. The hill section from Rotowaro to Glen Afton was difficult to construct, with a large "summit" cutting just before Glen Afton. Grades on the hill section were up to 1 in 50, with 150m (7.5 chain) radius curves. At the same time as the extension, tablet signalling was introduced between Huntly and Glen Afton.

There were several short private lines to mines at Rotowaro, Pukemiro and Glen Afton. In 1928 the line was operated by WW class locomotives, carrying about 350 miners a day and monthly coal outputs of 11,000 tons at Rotowaro, 15,000 at Pukemiro and 12,000 at Glen Afton, as well as bringing in supplies such as pit props. 

A bridge near Mahuta was damaged by dynamite during the 1951 Waterfront dispute.

In November 1959 a separate road bridge was opened. The Rotowaro to Glen Afton section west of Rotowaro was closed from 5 March 1973, as the mines had run out of coal. The line was shortened from 14.10 km to 7.97 km.

Traffic

Passenger traffic reached a peak in 1947, as shown in the graph and table below -

Motive power
The branch line was dieselised in 1966, with a special New Zealand Railway and Locomotive Society excursion train on 12 March 1966 to mark the change, hauled by two BB class steam locomotives. Passenger trains, mainly for miners, ran to 23 June 1972, apart from a special train for railway enthusiasts on 16 December 1972 hauled by a DI class diesel locomotive. A 1935 schedule allowed 45 minutes for the  all stations trip from Huntly to Glen Afton.

Preservation
From 1977 the section to Rotowaro, Pukemiro and Glen Afton was handed over to the Bush Tramway Club who operate over about 5 km of former NZR line, though the last 2.5 km to Glen Afton is no longer usable. Rotowaro station has been moved to the Bush Tramway Club.

References

Citations

Bibliography

External links 
 1969 timetable
1911 photos of turning the first sod, driving the first bridge pile and newspaper report
1952 photo of miners train on Huntly Bridge
 Solid Energy - Rotowaro mine leaflet, including photo of rail loading area
 Notice of timetable change in 1931

Railway lines in New Zealand
Rail transport in Waikato
Railway lines opened in 1911
Railway lines closed in 1977
3 ft 6 in gauge railways in New Zealand
1911 establishments in New Zealand
Closed railway lines in New Zealand